Sladkovsky (masculine), Sladkovskaya (feminine), or Sladkovskoye (neuter) may refer to:
Sladkovsky District, a district of Tyumen Oblast, Russia
Sladkovskoye, a rural locality (a selo) in Sverdlovsk Oblast, Russia